Kokkinia or Kokkinias may refer to several places in Greece:

 , a village in the municipal unit Lichada, Euboea
 Kokkinia, Grevena, a village in the municipal unit Irakleotes, Grevena regional unit
 Kokkinia, Kilkis, a village in the municipal unit Kroussa, Kilkis regional unit
 Kokkinia, Messenia, a village in the municipal unit Methoni, Messenia
 , a village in Filiates municipality, Thesprotia
 Kokkinia, older name for Nikaia, Athens Urban Area